The Parliament of Namibia is the national legislature of Namibia. It is a bicameral legislature and, thus, consists of two houses: the National Council (upper house) and the National Assembly (lower house).

All cabinet members are also members of the lower house. This situation has been criticised by Namibia's civil society and the opposition as creating a significant overlap between executive and legislature, undermining the separation of powers. The seniority of cabinet members generally relegate ordinary MPs to the back benches.

From Namibian independence until 2014 the National Assembly consisted of 78 members, 72 members elected by proportional representation and 6 members appointed by the president. The National Council had 26 representatives of the Regional Councils, 2 from each of the then thirteen regions. Prior to the 2014 general elections the constitution was amended to increase both chambers to their current size.

Speakers of Parliament 

 Hon. Prof. Peter Katjavivi, MP - Speaker of the National Assembly
 Hon. Prof. Loide Kasingo, MP - Deputy Speaker of the National Assembly

See also
Politics of Namibia
List of legislatures by country

References

External links
 

1990 establishments in Namibia
 
Namibia
Namibia
Namibia